Lewis Hippolytus Joseph Tonna (3 September 1812 – 2 April 1857) was an English polyglot and campaigner on behalf of evangelical protestantism.

Born Liverpool, son of the Spanish vice-consul and consul for the Kingdom of the Two Sicilies, his father died in 1828 while he was a student in Corfu and he was compelled to find employment as an interpreter aboard the Hydra. He served on various ships until returning to England in 1835 to become a director of the Royal United Services Institute.

Tonna married Charlotte Elizabeth Browne, a widow, in 1841 and the two were prolific pamphleteers for the evangelical Protestant cause. When Giacinto Achilli was interned following the fall of the Roman Republic, Tonna was prominent in the campaign for his release and return to England. Following Charlotte's death in 1846, in 1848 he married Mary Anne Dibdin, daughter of Charles Dibdin (the younger). Neither marriage produced children and Tonna died in London.

Honours
Fellow of the Society of Antiquaries;
Fellow of the Royal Geographical Society (1855).

References

Bibliography
Gilley, S. (2004) "Achilli, (Giovanni) Giacinto (b. c.1803)", Oxford Dictionary of National Biography, Oxford University Press, accessed 22 July 2007 (subscription required)
Laughton, J. K. (2004) "Tonna, Lewis Hippolytus Joseph (1812–1857)", rev. Stephen Gregory, Oxford Dictionary of National Biography, Oxford University Press, accessed 23 July 2007 (subscription required)

External links
:s:Tonna, Lewis Hippolytus Joseph

1812 births
1857 deaths
British religious writers
English evangelicals
British people of Spanish descent